is a railway station in the city of Tendō, Yamagata, Japan, operated by East Japan Railway Company (JR East).

Lines
Takatama Station is served by the Ōu Main Line, and is located  rail kilometers from the terminus of the line at Fukushima Station.

Station layout
The station has one side platform serving a single bi-directional track. The station is unattended.

History
Takatama Station opened on 5 March 1952. The station was absorbed into the JR East network upon the privatization of JNR on 1 April 1987. A new station building was completed in 1999.

Surrounding area
The area around the station is a dormitory community which then gives way in the west to rice paddies and fields and to the east to the mountains.
 Uyō-Gakuen College

See also
List of railway stations in Japan

References

External links

 JR East Station information 

Stations of East Japan Railway Company
Railway stations in Yamagata Prefecture
Ōu Main Line
Railway stations in Japan opened in 1952
Tendō, Yamagata